Steve Harley (born Stephen Malcolm Ronald Nice; 27 February 1951) is an English singer and songwriter, best known as frontman of the rock group Cockney Rebel, with whom he still tours, albeit with frequent and significant personnel changes.

Early life
Harley was born in 1951 in Deptford, London, the second of five children. His father was a milkman and his mother a semi-professional jazz singer.

During the summer of 1953, Harley contracted polio, causing him to spend four years in hospital between the ages of three and 16. He underwent two major surgeries in 1963 and 1966. After recovering from the first operation at the age of 12, Harley was introduced to the poetry of T. S. Eliot and D. H. Lawrence, the prose of John Steinbeck, Virginia Woolf and Ernest Hemingway, and the music of Bob Dylan, which inspired him to a career of words and music.

From the age of nine, Harley began taking classical violin lessons and would later play as part of his grammar school orchestra. Aged 10, he began learning the guitar after receiving a Spanish nylon-strung guitar from his parents at Christmas. Harley was a pupil at Edmund Waller Primary School in New Cross, London. He then attended Haberdashers' Aske's Hatcham Boys' Grammar School until he was 17. He left school without completing his advanced level exams.

Career
In 1968, at the age of 17, Harley began his first full-time job, working as a trainee accountant with the Daily Express – despite having gained only 24% in his mock O-level maths exam. From there he progressed to become a reporter. After being interviewed by several newspaper editors, Harley signed to train with Essex County Newspapers. Over three years, Harley worked at the Essex County Standard, the Braintree and Witham Times, the Maldon and Burnham Standard and the Colchester Evening Gazette. He later returned to London to work for the East London Advertiser (ELA). Harley became disillusioned with the job when his editor insisted he write a report on a shoplifter who had absentmindedly walked out with a tin of soup and a tin of baked beans. Taking advice from his union representative, he stopped wearing a tie, grew his hair and was duly sacked. Among many of Harley's peers who went on to gain successful careers in national journalism were John Blake and Richard Madeley; the latter took over Harley's desk at the ELA in 1972.

Harley started his musical career playing in bars and clubs in 1971, mainly at folk venues on open-mike nights. He sang at Les Cousins, Bunjies and The Troubadour on nights featuring John Martyn, Ralph McTell, Martin Carthy and Julie Felix, who were all popular musicians within the London folk movement of the time. In 1971, he auditioned for the folk band Odin as rhythm guitarist and co-singer, which was where he met Jean-Paul Crocker, who would become the first Cockney Rebel violinist. Harley began busking around London in 1972, including on the Underground and in Portobello Road, whilst also writing songs. After the folk scene proved not to be his preference, he formed the band Cockney Rebel in late 1972 as a vehicle for his own work.

Cockney Rebel 1972–77

The original Cockney Rebel consisted of Harley, Crocker, drummer Stuart Elliott, bassist Paul Jeffreys and guitarist Nick Jones. Jones was soon replaced by Pete Newnham; however, Harley felt the band did not need electric guitar, particularly with the arrival of keyboardist Milton Reame-James. They settled on the combination of Crocker's electric violin and Reame-James' Fender Rhodes piano.

During 1972, representatives of Cockney Rebel began to send demo tapes to various labels. Mickie Most discovered the band at a London nightclub known as The Speakeasy Club and offered them their first contract with his RAK Publishing. In turn this influenced the A&R personnel at EMI Records, who then offered the band a three-album deal. With producer Neil Harrison, Cockney Rebel recorded their debut album, The Human Menagerie, during June and July 1973. Their debut single "Sebastian" became a hit across Europe, but failed to chart in the UK. When released in November 1973, The Human Menagerie suffered a similar fate. Despite the lack of commercial success, the album was critically well-received and soon gained cult status.

The Human Menageries lack of success led EMI to feel that the band had yet to record a potential hit single. In response, Harley went away to re-work the unrecorded song "Judy Teen", with the objective of making it single material. "Judy Teen" was released in March 1974 and peaked at No. 5 in the UK. During February and March 1974, the band recorded their second album The Psychomodo, which was produced by Harley and Alan Parsons. Released in June, the album peaked at No. 8 in the UK. From May until July the band embarked on a major UK tour to promote the album; tensions grew among them as the tour progressed. On 18 July they received a 'Gold Award' for outstanding new act of 1974; a week later, with the tour finished, several members left over the disagreements. Crocker, Reame-James and Jeffreys chose to quit, having unsuccessfully demanded to write material for the group despite the initial understanding that Harley was the sole songwriter. Following the band's split, the single "Mr. Soft", taken from The Psychomodo, reached No. 8 in the UK.

Left without a permanent band, Harley soon began auditioning new musicians. Meanwhile, Harley and Parsons worked with Dutch singer Yvonne Keeley in the studio. In August 1974, EMI released her version of "Tumbling Down" as a single, backed by another Cockney Rebel cover, "Loretta's Tale". During September, Harley recorded his debut solo single "Big Big Deal", which was released in November. The song failed to enter the UK Top 50; however, it did enter the unnumbered BMRB's UK Breakers chart. By this time, a new line-up of Cockney Rebel had been finalised. With original drummer Stuart Elliott remaining in the band, the new line-up included guitarist Jim Cregan, keyboard player Duncan Mackay and bassist George Ford. Renamed Steve Harley & Cockney Rebel, they recorded the album The Best Years of Our Lives in November and December 1974, with Harley and Parsons again producing.

In January 1975, the lead single from the forthcoming album, "Make Me Smile (Come Up and See Me)", was released. Becoming the band's biggest hit, the song reached the number one spot on the UK Chart in February and received a UK Silver certification that month. It was also Harley's only chart entry in America, reaching No. 96 on the Billboard Hot 100 in 1976. In a 2002 television interview, Harley described how the lyrics were directed at the former band members who, he felt, had abandoned him. As of 2015, the song has sold around 1.5 million copies in the UK. The Performing Rights Society have confirmed the song as one of the most played records in British broadcasting, while over 120 cover versions of the song have been recorded by other artists.

The Best Years of Our Lives was released in March 1975, reaching No. 5 in the UK. The second single from the album, "Mr. Raffles (Man, It Was Mean)", was also a success, reaching No. 13. The band embarked on a UK and European tour to promote the album. During the summer, the band recorded their fourth studio album Timeless Flight. Around the same period Harley also produced Dutch singer Patricia Paay's album Beam of Light, with members of Cockney Rebel performing on many of the tracks. Later in the year, Harley and the band went on tour in the US as a support act to The Kinks. As the band had not achieved commercial success in the States, the compilation A Closer Look was released exclusively for the American market.

Timeless Flight was released in February 1976, and became a Top 20 UK success, peaking at No. 18; however, the two singles "Black or White" and "White, White Dove" failed to reach the UK Top 50. They reached No. 2 and No. 6 on the BMRB's UK Breakers Chart respectively. Another UK and European tour followed the album's release. Between June and September 1976, the band recorded their fifth album Love's a Prima Donna. In July they released a cover of George Harrison's "Here Comes the Sun", which reached No. 10 in the UK and became the band's last Top 40 single, discounting later re-releases of "Make Me Smile". Love's a Prima Donna was released in October 1976 and peaked at No. 28 in the UK. It also spawned a second charting single; "(I Believe) Love's a Prima Donna", which reached No. 41. In America, "(Love) Compared with You" was released as a single. During August and September 1976, Mackay recorded his second solo album Score, which was released in 1977. Harley wrote the lyrics to four tracks, and provided lead vocals on "Time is No Healer".

In November 1976, Harley provided backing vocals on T. Rex's song "Dandy in the Underworld", which was released as a single from the album of the same name in 1977. In December 1976, the band embarked on an eight-date UK tour to promote Love's a Prima Donna. During the early part of 1977, Harley provided lead vocals on The Alan Parsons Project's song "The Voice" for their album I Robot. In July, Harley disbanded Cockney Rebel, the announcement of which was followed by the release of a live album, Face to Face: A Live Recording, which reached No. 40 and spawned the single "The Best Years of Our Lives".

Beginnings of solo career 1977–79
With Cockney Rebel's split, Harley signed to EMI for a further three years and began recording his debut solo album. He flew to Los Angeles in February 1978 to complete it and soon decided to emigrate to the US. He purchased a house in Beverly Hills and stayed there for nearly a year to gain new experience and inspirations. However, Harley later admitted that during his time in America he was never inspired to write a single song. The album Hobo with a Grin was released in July 1978, but was a commercial failure. The lead single "Roll the Dice" failed to chart, as did the second single, a remixed version of "Someone's Coming", which was released in early 1979. On the album, the track "Amerika the Brave" featured Marc Bolan's last studio performance, recorded shortly before his fatal car accident.

Harley returned to London at the end of 1978. In February 1979, he recorded his second solo album The Candidate. On 12 May, Harley and Peter Gabriel appeared as guest stars at one of Kate Bush's Hammersmith Odeon concerts during her Tour of Life. The show was staged as a benefit concert for the family of lighting technician Bill Duffield, who had died after a tragic fall earlier on Bush's tour. Duffield had previously worked for Harley and Gabriel. The concert was Harley's first performance on stage for over two years. Released in September, The Candidate was another commercial failure, although its single "Freedom's Prisoner" was moderately successful, peaking at No. 58. In October, Harley performed a one-off show at the Hammersmith Odeon. Following the disappointing sales of The Candidate, EMI dropped Harley from their label.

1980–89
During the 1980s, which he would later describe as his "wilderness years", Harley took time out from the music business while his two children were growing up. In 1980 he formed a new line-up of Cockney Rebel for a short UK tour in July, followed by a UK Christmas tour. The latter tour followed the release of the compilation The Best of Steve Harley and Cockney Rebel in November. During the same year "Somebody Special" and "Gi' Me Wings", two songs co-written by Harley, were released by Rod Stewart on his 1980 album Foolish Behaviour. "Somebody Special", as the album's third single in 1981, reached No. 71 on the US Billboard Hot 100, and "Gi' Me Wings" reached No. 45 on the Billboard Top Rock Tracks chart.

In 1981, Harley was approached by Rick Wakeman to provide vocals on the song "No Name" for Wakeman's album 1984. He also made an appearance to perform the song at Wakeman's concert at the Hammersmith Odeon. Harley and his band would embark on another small UK tour during Christmas 1981. In March 1982, the band released the non-album single "I Can't Even Touch You". Produced by Midge Ure, the song failed to chart, despite expectations that it would become a hit. In August 1982, Harley made his acting debut as the 16th-century playwright Christopher Marlowe in the rock musical Marlowe at the John Crawford Adams Playhouse at Hofstra University, Hempstead, New York. Cockney Rebel played a one-off concert in London in June 1983, and Harley also released the single "Ballerina (Prima Donna)", which was written and produced by Mike Batt. It was one of Harley's most successful singles of the decade, peaking at No. 51 in the UK. In July, the band appeared at the Reading Festival. In December 1984, Harley and his band played a one-off concert at the Camden Palace in London. It proved to be the band's last show until 1989, and was filmed for a special TV broadcast. It was also released on VHS in 1985, titled Live from London.

In 1985, Harley signed a five-album recording contract with RAK Records and recorded "Irresistible" with Mickie Most as producer. Released as his debut single for the label in June 1985, it peaked at No. 81 in the UK. Harley had originally offered the song to Rod Stewart, who encouraged Harley to record it in the hope that it would put him back in the charts. Later that year, Mike Batt suggested that Harley sing the title track of the upcoming The Phantom of the Opera musical. Andrew Lloyd Webber had decided to record and release a single to promote the upcoming musical. Agreeing to audition, Harley was given the job and soon recorded the song with Sarah Brightman. The song reached No. 7 in the UK charts in January 1986. A music video was also created, featuring Harley as the Phantom. A prime candidate for the role in the musical, Harley soon auditioned to play the Phantom. Successful in getting the part, he then spent five months working on the role, including rehearsal with producer Hal Prince. He was later surprised when he ended up being replaced by Michael Crawford.

While rehearsing for the musical, Harley released the non-album single "Heartbeat Like Thunder" in April 1986, though it was a commercial failure. In June 1986, a newly remixed version of "Irresistible" appeared as a single. Released as the lead single from Harley's forthcoming solo album El Gran Senor, the single failed to chart. Shortly afterwards, RAK folded and was sold to EMI, leaving the album to be shelved. Later that year, Harley starred again as Marlowe when the musical of the same name ran in London. Harley's performance was described by one leading critic as "a major and moving performance." During the same period, Harley undertook an English 'A' level course, to which he devoted three hours of study each day. He passed in June 1987 with a 'B' grade.

In 1988, Batt approached Harley to provide vocals on his song "Whatever You Believe", alongside Jon Anderson. On 3 May 1988, the trio performed the song at a live TV broadcast at Battersea Park in London, as part of the Thames/LWT charity fundraising effort for the ITV Telethon. Later in November, a studio version was released as a charity TV tie-in single under the name Anderson, Harley & Batt. It did not chart. Following its use in a successful TV advert for Trebor Softmints, "Mr Soft" was re-issued as a single in 1988, but also failed to chart.

In 1989, Harley assembled a new line-up of Cockney Rebel and began touring in the UK and Europe. The band's return to touring was a success and has led Harley to continue performing with various incarnations of Cockney Rebel to the present day. To promote the 1989 summer tour, Harley released the solo single "When I'm with You", which had been recorded in early 1989 with ex-Cockney Rebel members Duncan Mackay and Jim Cregan at London's Point Studios. Later in October, a VHS using concert footage from the tour was released under the title The Come Back, All is Forgiven Tour: Live.

In late 1989, Harley was scheduled to play the title role in a feature film based on the true story of John 'Babbacombe' Lee, an Englishman famous for surviving three attempts to hang him for murder. However, the film never raised the necessary funding and the project was cancelled in the early 1990s.

1990–99
Throughout 1989 and 1990, Harley continued recording material and working on a new album. During 1990, Harley also contributed to the album Poetry in Motion by providing lead vocals on the track "Harrow on the Hill". The album consisted of fourteen tracks featuring the words of Sir John Betjeman and music by Mike Read. In October 1991, Harley was invited to play Night of the Proms, where he performed "Sebastian" and "Make Me Smile".

By the early 1990s, Harley and his band had established themselves as a major live act across Europe. In 1992, EMI released a new compilation album, Make Me Smile – The Best of Steve Harley and Cockney Rebel, along with a re-issue of "Make Me Smile" as a single, which reached No. 46 in the UK. Harley's solo album Yes You Can was released in Europe in 1992 and the UK in 1993. The album featured a mix of older songs dating from the El Gran Senor period, as well as some newer tracks. In Europe, "Irresistible" was released as a single from the album, while "Star for a Week (Dino)" was released as a UK promotional single in 1993.

In 1995, the live compilation Live at the BBC was released; it included some early Cockney Rebel sessions from 1974, as well as a 1992 session. The same year saw a re-issue of "Make Me Smile" reach No. 33 in the UK. Harley released a new studio album, Poetic Justice, in 1996, which was a critical success. In 1997, he participated in the Granada Men & Motors TV music quiz show Elvis Has Just Left the Building, hosted by Mike Sweeney, with Noddy Holder and Clint Boon as team captains.

In 1998, Harley embarked on his first acoustic tour "Stripped to the Bare Bones". Alongside Cockney Rebel violinist/guitarist Nick Pynn, the pair played over a hundred dates, including fifty-four concerts in the UK alone. Coinciding with the tour was the release of the new compilation album More Than Somewhat – The Very Best of Steve Harley, which reached No. 82 in the UK. In September 1999, the live acoustic album Stripped to the Bare Bones was released, which had been recorded at The Jazz Café in London during March 1998. In 1999, the new compilation The Cream of Steve Harley & Cockney Rebel was released, which would later reach No. 21 on the UK Budget Albums Chart in 2006.

In 1999, Harley began presenting the BBC Radio programme The Sounds of the Seventies, with the first series that year featuring eight editions. He also formed his own label "Comeuppance" that year.

2000–09

In 2000, Harley re-issued his first two solo albums Hobo with a Grin and The Candidate on CD through Comeuppance, while in March–May he embarked the acoustic tour "Stripped Again", accompanied by Cockney Rebel guitarist Robbie Gladwell. That same year saw the airing of the second series of The Sounds of the Seventies show, which had twelve editions across 2000. Following high listening figures for the first two series, Harley accepted the BBC's offer to present the show all-year round. To accommodate his touring schedule, Harley began the new deal by pre-recording three shows at a time. The show continued for the next eight years, with the last programme airing on 27 March 2008. The show reached an audience of over 400,000 weekly.

In 2000, Harley started working on a new studio album and began talks with various record companies. Although no album would surface for a few years, the single "A Friend for Life" was released in April 2001. It reached No. 125 in the UK. Co-written with Jim Cregan, Harley had offered the song to Rod Stewart, who would later record a version for his 2015 album Another Country. In 2001, Harley and the band embarked on their first tour in four years, which was named "Back with the Band".

Since 2002, Harley has been involved with the charity Mines Advisory Group. He later became an Ambassador for the charity and has led two fundraising treks; one around Cambodia in 2002 and the other across Death Valley in 2007. During 2002, Harley was also awarded a Gold Badge of Merit by the British Academy of Composers and Songwriters. In 2003, Harley released the acoustic live album Acoustic and Pure: Live, featuring recordings from various UK concerts played during the previous autumn with Cregan. Towards the end of the year, Harley travelled to Cologne to collaborate with German artist Guido Dossche on the song "Ich Bin Gott", which was released as a single in Germany in 2004.

In 2004, the live album Anytime! (A Live Set) was released under the name The Steve Harley Band. During June of that year, Steve Harley & Cockney Rebel played at the Isle of Wight Festival. The full performance was released on DVD in 2005, titled Live at the Isle of Wight Festival. In June 2005, a newly recorded version of "Make Me Smile" was released, dubbed as the "30th Anniversary Re-mix", which reached No. 55 in the UK.

A new studio album, The Quality of Mercy, was released in 2005, which was Harley's first studio album to be released under the Cockney Rebel name since 1976. To promote the album, the band embarked on their biggest UK and European tour since the 1970s, with over 50 dates set between September–December. The album was a critical success and also charted at No. 40 in Norway in early 2006. The album included "A Friend for Life", while "The Last Goodbye" was released from it as a single in 2006. It reached No. 186 in the UK, and No. 21 on the UK Independent Singles Chart.

In 2006, EMI released a CD box-set compilation album spanning Cockney Rebel and Harley's solo work, titled The Cockney Rebel - A Steve Harley Anthology. In 2007, Harley starred with Mike Bennett in the West End premiere of the Samuel Beckett plays Rough for Theatre I and Rough for Theatre II. The plays ran for a week in July at London's Arts Theatre. In 2008, Harley released his first book The Impression of Being Relaxed. Published by Halstar, it is a collection of diary entries Harley had published on his website between 2000 and 2008. In 2009, Harley received a Special Award from Childline Rocks for his work for charity at the Classic Rock magazine Award ceremony at London's Park Lane Hotel. His work raising money for the Mines Advisory group and several schools for Disabled Children were cited in a speech delivered by blues guitarist Joe Bonamassa.

2010–present

During September and October 2009, Harley and his band returned to the studio to record a new album at Leeders Farm Residential Studios. In May 2010, Harley released his new studio album Stranger Comes to Town, which peaked at No. 187 in the UK. Described by Harley as a protest album, two digital singles were released from the album; "Faith & Virtue" and "For Sale. Baby Shoes. Never Worn". Earlier that year in February, Harley, a self-confessed technophobe, attributed poor literacy rates and the moral corrosion of British society to modern technology.

In April 2012, Harley teamed up with Australian guitarist Joe Matera and embarked on a promotional tour of Australia. The pair made a number of appearances on radio and TV, performing live acoustic sessions. This included the SBS TV show RocKwiz, Noise 11 TV and Melbourne radio station Gold FM 104.3. In October 2012, EMI released a remastered four-disc box-set anthology compilation Cavaliers: An Anthology 1973-1974, which chronicled the recording career of the original Cockney Rebel line-up.

On 24 November 2012, Harley and his band, along with the Orchestra of the Swan and their Chamber Choir, performed the first two Cockney Rebel albums The Human Menagerie and The Psychomodo in their entirety for the first time. A live double-CD and DVD was released in October 2013 of this performance, titled Birmingham. The album peaked at No. 158 in the UK and No. 36 on the UK Independent Albums Chart. In 2014, Harley and the band performed the same show again four times in the UK.

In January 2015, "Make Me Smile" re-charted at No. 72 in the UK, after Top Gear presenters Jeremy Clarkson, Richard Hammond and James May urged viewers to download the song, as part of their discussion that Harley had recently received a speeding fine. Later in September, Harley's first new song of five years, "Ordinary People", was released as a single on iTunes. In November, Harley and the surviving members of the original second line-up of Cockney Rebel, embarked on a 16-date UK tour to celebrate the 40th anniversary of The Best Years of Our Lives album. On the tour, the band were backed by the MonaLisa Twins.

In 2015, Harley pledged to help raise funds for a new memorial to his late friend Mick Ronson. In April 2016, Harley played for free at the Hull City Hall to help kick-start the appeal. In November 2016, Harley was one of a number of musicians who teamed up with British Members of Parliament and the Royal Opera House Thurrock Community Chorus to record a charity version of the Rolling Stones song "You Can't Always Get What You Want" in memory of Labour MP Jo Cox. The song was released by Chrysalis Records in December 2016, with all proceedings going to the Jo Cox Foundation. It reached No. 136 on the UK Singles Chart, No. 24 on the UK Singles Sales Chart and No. 9 on the Top 30 Indie Singles Chart.

After the success of 1998 and 1999's respective 'Stripped To The Bare Bones' and 'Stripped Again' tours, Harley would continue to tour in an acoustic format. Firstly with Jim Cregan and a selection of other members of Cockney Rebel, depending on the exact date of the show, in 2002. This format produced 2003's 'Acoustic and Pure: Live' album. With the exception of the 2015 reunion, which was in the full band format, Cregan would next join Harley for 2 acoustic shows in March 2020, which otherwise featured Harley performing alone. In 2003 and 2004, the 5-piece acoustic line-up that played 2004's 'Anytime! (A Live Set)' album was put together, featuring Lascelles on percussion, Gladwell on lead guitar, Wickens on violin/guitar, and Anderson on double bass. In 2005 and 2006, this format was used in Holland and Belgium while promoting 2005's 'The Quality Of Mercy' album, and these shows are notable for featuring significant rearrangements of some of the songs from the album, which were never played during concerts in England. These shows were played without Anderson. Between 2010 and 2019 these concerts were revived as a 3-man line-up, with Harley alongside Wickens and Lascelles (this time on keyboards and percussion, as per his role in the full rock band shows). These shows were originally marketed as the '3-man acoustic show' before being renamed to 'Acoustic Trio' in 2016. The shows in 2010 were marketed as an 'Acoustic Set', as they were the first acoustic shows since 2004. This format was phased out in 2020 - in order to promote Harley's new album 'Uncovered'- in favour of a revived 4-man line-up, though with David Delarre on lead guitar, and Oli Hayhurst on double bass, with Harley and Wickens reprising their roles. The COVID-19 pandemic delayed most of the shows on this tour - with only the first 9 played as planned. Two shows were however played in late-September 2020, both in the acoustic trio format, though Hayhurst accompanied the trio on the second of these shows. In addition, Harley held an online Q and A session via Zoom Videoconferencing in mid-December 2020, and will hold another in late-November 2021.

In the aftermath of the 2020 pandemic, Harley's live shows eventually resumed in July 2021. The set-lists for these shows are notable in that they include much material that has been left unplayed for, in some cases, almost 30 years.

Personal life
Harley lives in North Essex with his wife, Dorothy, whom he married at Marylebone Register Office in February 1981. They have two children, Kerr and Greta. In 1991, the pair celebrated their tenth anniversary with a wedding blessing ceremony at their local church in Belchamp Otten, Essex. Harley has been involved in racehorse ownership since 1984, and racing has become his main pastime.

Partial discography

Studio albums

 The Human Menagerie (1973) (as Cockney Rebel)
 The Psychomodo (1974) (as Cockney Rebel)
 The Best Years of Our Lives (1975) (as Steve Harley & Cockney Rebel)
 Timeless Flight (1976) (as Steve Harley & Cockney Rebel)
 Love's a Prima Donna (1976) (as Steve Harley & Cockney Rebel)
 Hobo with a Grin (1978)
 The Candidate (1979)
 Yes You Can (1992)
 Poetic Justice (1996)
 The Quality of Mercy (2005) (as Steve Harley & Cockney Rebel)
 Stranger Comes to Town (2010)
 Uncovered (2020)

References

External links
BBC Radio 2 Biography
Official Steve Harley website

1951 births
Living people
People from Deptford
English male singers
English radio presenters
English rock singers
English songwriters
Rak Records artists
People with polio
Glam rock musicians
Musicians from Kent
Steve Harley & Cockney Rebel members
British male songwriters